Rhytidosteus is an extinct genus of temnospondyl amphibian from the Early Triassic of South Africa. In 2019, the remains were also discovered in the Astrakhan region, Russia.

References

Early Triassic amphibians of Africa
Triassic amphibians
Taxa named by Richard Owen
Fossil taxa described in 1884